Iwano may refer to:
 10805 Iwano, a main-belt asteroid, named after Japanese engineer and amateur astronomer Hisaka Iwano (born 1957)
 Hōmei Iwano (1873–1920), a Japanese writer